Benjamin Law may refer to:

 Benjamin Law (inventor) (1773–?), inventor of the shoddy process
 Benjamin Law (artist) (1807–1882), 19th-century sculptor
 Benjamin Law (writer) (born 1982), Australian author and journalist

See also
 Law (surname)